Acacia gregorii, commonly known as Gregory's wattle, is a shrub belonging to the genus Acacia and the subgenus Phyllodineae native to Western Australia.

Description
It blooms from June to August and produces yellow flowers. Following flowering oblong hairy seed pods form that are crowded on the receptacle.

Taxonomy
The species was first formally described by the botanist Ferdinand von Mueller in 1826 in the work Fragmenta Phytographiae Australiae. It was reclassified by Leslie Pedley in 2003 as Racosperma gregorii as part of the work A synopsis of Racosperma C.Mart. (Leguminosae: Mimosoideae) as published in Austrobaileya then transferred back to the genus Acacia in 2006.

It is similar in appearance to Acacia crispula and Acacia shuttleworthii which are both found further south. It also shares some affinities with Acacia crassistipula.

The species name honours Francis Thomas Gregory who crossed the Pilbara as part of his 1861 expedition.

Distribution
It is native to an area along the west coast in the Gascoyne, Pilbara and Mid West regions of Western Australia where it is found on sandplains, coastal hills and among limestone outcrops growing in red sandy soils as a part of spinifex or in heathland communities.

See also
List of Acacia species

References

gregorii
Acacias of Western Australia
Taxa named by Ferdinand von Mueller
Plants described in 1862